Marshall Kay (November 10, 1904 – September 4, 1975) was a geologist and professor at Columbia University. He is best known for his studies of the Ordovician of New York, Newfoundland, and Nevada, but his studies were global and he published widely on the stratigraphy of the middle and upper Ordovician. Kay's careful fieldwork provided much geological evidence for the theory of continental drift. He was awarded the Penrose Medal in 1971. Less well known is his work for the Manhattan Project, as a geologist searching for manganese deposits. Marshall's son Robert Kay of Cornell University, daughter Elizabeth (Kay) Berner of University of Connecticut and son-in-law Robert Berner of Yale University are also geology professors. His son Richard Kay of Duke University is a biological anthropologist and vertebrate paleontologist.

Kay received his Ph.D. from Columbia in 1929.

Bibliography
 Marshall Kay, North American geosynclines (Memoir 48), Geological Society of America, 1951.

References
  
 Kirtley F. Mather, A Source Book in Geology, 1900–1950.  Harvard University Press, 1969.  . pp. 347–348.

External links
Finding aid to Marshall Kay papers at Columbia University. Rare Book & Manuscript Library.
Trenton Group scientific history, "Academic Period" bio at Harvard
University of Iowa distinguished alumni award bio, 1971
Time Magazine obituary, 1975
University of Iowa Paleontology Repository Archive, finder's aid retrieved 21 April 2009.  Boxes 3–5 contain stratigraphy class notes and maps and a memorial from Robert H. Dott Jr.

1904 births
1975 deaths
20th-century American geologists
Penrose Medal winners
Columbia University alumni
Columbia University faculty
Lamont–Doherty Earth Observatory people
Stratigraphy
People from Leonia, New Jersey
Tectonicists